2022 Kabul bombing may refer to:

 April 2022 Kabul mosque bombing
 April 2022 Kabul school bombing
 May 2022 Kabul mosque bombing
 5 August 2022 Kabul bombing
 August 2022 Kabul mosque bombing
 Bombing of the Russian embassy in Kabul
 September 2022 Kabul mosque bombing
 September 2022 Kabul school bombing